Paredes de Sigüenza is a municipality in the province of Guadalajara, Castile-La Mancha, Spain. The municipality has 32.95 km2 and had a population of 28 inhabitants, according to the 2013 census (INE).

References

Municipalities in the Province of Guadalajara